The 1993 San Marino motorcycle Grand Prix was the ninth round of the 1993 Grand Prix motorcycle racing season. It took place on 18 July 1993, at the Mugello Circuit.

500 cc race report
Doug Chandler crashes in qualifying and briefly loses consciousness, which automatically DQd him from the race.

Mick Doohan’s 3rd pole in a row. Doohan takes the start from Wayne Rainey and Kevin Schwantz.

Down the straight, Rainey is extending his leg as if he has a problem.

The lead is a 2-man battle, and Doohan almost highsides on the turn leading to the straight and lets Schwantz through for the lead. They swap the front many times, but Schwantz develops a tire problem and nurses it home to 2nd. In the battle with Schwantz, Doohan demonstrates that any lingering weakness from Assen '92 isn't enough to prevent him from riding at the highest level.

500 cc classification

250 cc classification

References

San Marino and Rimini Riviera motorcycle Grand Prix
San Marino
San Marino Motorcycle Grand Prix
San Marino Motorcycle Grand Prix